Providence may refer to:
Providence, Fairfax County, Virginia, now Fairfax
Providence, Grayson County, Virginia
Providence, Halifax County, Virginia
Providence Church, Virginia, in Suffolk
Providence Forge, Virginia, in New Kent County
Providence Junction, Virginia, in Chesapeake